Blofield and East and West Flegg Rural Districts were adjacent rural districts in Norfolk, England from 1894 to 1935. 

They were formed under the Local Government Act 1894 based on rural sanitary districts of the same names, and lay between Norwich and Great Yarmouth. East and West Flegg RD included a detached portion, itself an outlying part of Runham parish.

In 1935 the two districts, with very minor changes around Great Yarmouth, were merged to form Blofield and Flegg Rural District. Subsequently, changes to the border with Norwich County Borough were made in 1951.

In 1974, the merged district was abolished under the Local Government Act 1972, and became mainly part of the Broadland district, with a small part being added to the Borough of Great Yarmouth.

Statistics

Parishes
These parishes operated within Blofield and Flegg RD unless otherwise indicated.

References

Districts of England created by the Local Government Act 1894
Districts of England abolished by the Local Government Act 1972
Historical districts of Norfolk
Rural districts of England